Garmisch-Partenkirchen station is a junction station  in the German State of Bavaria. It is the biggest station in Garmisch-Partenkirchen. It has five platform tracks and is classified by Deutsche Bahn as a category 3 station. 
The station has about 50 services daily operated by DB Regio and some long-distance services operated by Deutsche Bahn. It is on the lines connecting Munich and Garmisch-Partenkirchen, Garmisch-Partenkirchen and Innsbruck (the Mittenwald Railway) and Garmisch-Partenkirchen and Reutte (the Ausserfern Railway).

History
The station was established on 25 July 1889 as the terminus of a branch line from Munich opened by Lokalbahn AG. It was initially connected to Munich by four to six pairs of trains daily. On 1 July 1912, was the line was extended with the opening of the Mittenwald Railway and Garmisch-Partenkirchen was now a through station. The line was electrified in the course of the extension of the Mittenwald line to Innsbruck, opened on 25 April 1913. In May 1913, the Ausserfern Railway was opened from Reutte to the station. This was electrified from the start.

A special feature for decades was the operational stop for Austrian through trains between Innsbruck and Reutte. This was necessary so that trains could reverse direction in Garmisch-Partenkirchen, but passengers were not allowed on or off, which would have required customs and immigration clearance until the implementation of the Schengen Agreement.

On 12 December 1995 the Garmisch-Partenkirchen train collision at the station, when a departing RegioExpress train smashed into an arriving touristic train after passing a signal at danger, injuring 41 and killing one.

On 3 June 2022 the Garmisch-Partenkirchen train derailment happened to the north of the station when several carriages of a departing regio train derailed, killing five people and injuring 68 others.

Description 

The station lies between the two districts of Garmisch in the west and Partenkirchen in the east. The railway yards are located at Garmisch area. The Partnach flows between the station and Partenkirchen. The station area is bordered to the east by Bahnhofstraße and to the west by Weitfelderstraße and Olympiastraße. Sankt-Martin-Straße passes through an underpass under the station area. The entrance building was modernised and renovated in the late 1990s and it is located on the eastern side of the railway facilities towards Partenkirchen. Its address is 31 Bahnhofstraße.

In addition to the home platform, there are two more platforms. Behind it there are five tracks for train parking and freight operations.

The platforms are covered and accessible via lifts and stairways. The platform roofs were renewed from October 2009 to January 2011 and the platforms were fitted with tactile paving. The station building includes shops and a ticket office. It is served by the public bus network.

Rail services
Garmisch-Partenkirchen is served by four pairs of Intercity-Express services on Saturday and Sunday (mostly seasonal) operated by Deutsche Bahn as well as Regionalbahn and peak Regional-Express services operated by DB Regio between Munich and Garmisch-Partenkirchen. The Regionalbahn services run every two hours to/from Seefeld in Tirol and every four hours to/from Innsbruck, Reutte. Trains run to/from Reutte every hour on weekdays. Most of the trains from Munich are divided in Garmisch-Partenkirchen, with one part going to Mittenwald or Innsbruck and the other to Reutte. Similarly the trains from Mittenwald or Innsbruck are mostly coupled in Garmisch-Partenkirchen with trains from Reutte before proceeding to Munich.

The following local buses (operated by the municipal utility) and regional bus lines (Oberbayernbus) as well as the long-distance FlixBus stop at or near the station:

Bavarian Zugspitze Mountain Railway 

In the immediate neighbourhood, the Bavarian Zugspitze Railway (Bayerische Zugspitzbahn, BZB) has operated since 1929 a separate terminal station, called Garmisch station. Unofficially, it is sometimes called Zugspitze station (Zugspitzbahnhof). Since a restoration, it consists of only one track (without a number) with  platforms on both sides, a siding at the entrance to the station and an entrance building at the end of the track.

References

Railway stations in Garmisch-Partenkirchen
Station
Buildings and structures in Garmisch-Partenkirchen (district)
Railway stations in Germany opened in 1889
1889 establishments in Bavaria